Rgajska planina (Serbian Cyrillic: Ргајска планина) is a mountain in southern Serbia, near the town of Prokuplje. Its highest peak  has an elevation of 1,017 meters above sea level.

References

Mountains of Serbia